Patricia Clarkson is an American actress who made her film debut in Brian De Palma's mob drama The Untouchables (1987), followed by a supporting role in Clint Eastwood's The Dead Pool (1988). After appearing in minor roles in the early and mid-1990s, she garnered critical attention for her portrayal of a drug-addicted actress in the independent drama High Art (1998). She appeared in numerous supporting roles in such films as The Green Mile (1999), The Pledge (2001), Far from Heaven (2002), and Dogville (2003).

She received a Screen Actors Guild Award nomination for her role in the 2003 drama film The Station Agent, as well as a nomination for Golden Globe and an Academy Award for Best Supporting Actress for Pieces of April. Clarkson also appeared as a recurring guest star on the HBO series Six Feet Under from 2002 to 2006, and won two Primetime Emmy Awards for her performance. Other credits from the 2000s include Good Night, and Good Luck with David Strathairn (2005), Lars and the Real Girl with Ryan Gosling (2007), and Elegy with Penélope Cruz (2008). She also appeared in Woody Allen films Vicky Cristina Barcelona (2008) and Whatever Works (2009).

In 2010, Clarkson had a supporting role in Martin Scorsese's thriller Shutter Island, followed by roles in the comedies Easy A and Friends with Benefits. She subsequently portrayed the villainous Ava Paige in The Maze Runner (2014) and its two sequels. In 2017, she won a British Independent Film Award for Best Supporting Actress for her performance in Sally Potter's drama The Party, and guest-starred on the Netflix series House of Cards. She co-starred with Amy Adams on the HBO miniseries Sharp Objects in 2018, for which she won a Golden Globe for Best Supporting Actress in a Series, Miniseries, or Television Film.

Clarkson's theater career started in 1986 where she was the replacement for the role of Corrinna Stroller in the The House of Blue Leaves. She played both roles of Nan and Lina in the 1997 play Three Days of Rain. She returned to theater in 2014, playing the role of Madge Kendal in a Broadway production of The Elephant Man, for which she was nominated for a Tony Award for Best Featured Actress.

Film

Television

Stage

References

External links
 
 
 

American filmographies
Actress filmographies